Boaventura da Silva Cardoso (born 26 July 1944) is an Angolan politician as well as noted author. He has been the Minister of Culture since December 2002 until 2008.

Sources
 Profile of Boaventura Cardoso 

1944 births
Living people
Ambassadors of Angola to France
Ambassadors of Angola to Italy
Angolan writers
Culture ministers of Angola
Information ministers of Angola
Governors of Malanje